In Concert Volume Two is a live album recorded in 1973 by jazz trumpeter Freddie Hubbard, pianist Herbie Hancock and tenor saxophonist Stanley Turrentine.  It was recorded in Chicago and Detroit for Creed Taylor's CTI label and features performances by Hubbard, Turrentine, Hancock, guitarist Eric Gale, bassist Ron Carter and drummer Jack DeJohnette.

Track listing
 "Hornets" [Chicago Version] - 9:40  
 "Interlude" - 1:17  
 "Hornets" [Detroit Version] - 9:47  
 "Gilbraltar" [Detroit Version] (Hubbard) - 21:09  
All compositions by Herbie Hancock except as indicated
Recorded at the "Chicago Opera House", Chicago, on March 3 (tracks 1 & 2) and the "Ford Auditorium", Detroit on March 4 (tracks 3 & 4), 1973

Personnel
Freddie Hubbard - trumpet
Stanley Turrentine - tenor saxophone
Herbie Hancock - piano
Eric Gale - guitar
Ron Carter - bass
Jack DeJohnette - drums

References

Albums produced by Creed Taylor
Herbie Hancock live albums
1973 live albums
Stanley Turrentine live albums
Freddie Hubbard live albums
CTI Records live albums